Gaddochak is a village in the Chandauli district of Uttar Pradesh, India.

References

Villages in Chandauli district